Robert Heath Dennard (born September 5, 1932) is an American electrical engineer and inventor.

Biography
Dennard was born in Terrell, Texas, U.S. He received his B.S. and M.S. degrees in Electrical Engineering from Southern Methodist University, Dallas, in 1954 and 1956, respectively. He earned a Ph.D. from Carnegie Institute of Technology in Pittsburgh, Pennsylvania, in 1958. His professional career was spent as a researcher for International Business Machines.

In 1966 he invented the one transistor memory cell consisting of a transistor and a capacitor for which a patent was issued in 1968.  It became the basis for today's dynamic random-access memory (DRAM). Dennard was also among the first to recognize the tremendous potential of downsizing MOSFETs. The scaling theory he and his colleagues formulated in 1974 postulated that MOSFETs continue to function as voltage-controlled switches while all key figures of merit such as layout density, operating speed, and energy efficiency improve – provided geometric dimensions, voltages, and doping concentrations are consistently scaled to maintain the same electric field.  This property underlies the achievement of Moore's Law and the evolution of microelectronics over the last few decades.

In 1984, Dennard was elected a member of the National Academy of Engineering for pioneering work in FET technology, including invention of the one transistor dynamic RAM and contributions to scaling theory.

Awards and honors
 Robert N. Noyce Award (2019)
Kyoto Prize (2013)
Carnegie Mellon University Honorary Doctor of Science and Technology (2010)
IEEE Medal of Honor (2009)
IEEE Edison Medal (2001)
Benjamin Franklin Medal in Electrical Engineering from The Franklin Institute (2007)
U.S. National Academy of Engineering (NAE) Charles Stark Draper Prize (2009)
elected member of the American Philosophical Society (1997)
Southern Methodist University Honorary Doctor of Science (1997)
Harvey Prize from Technion Institute in Haifa / Israel (1990)
Industrial Research Institute (IRI) Achievement Award (1989)
U.S. National Medal of Technology (1988)
 National Academy of Engineering Member (1984)
IEEE Cledo Brunetti Award (1982)
 appointed IBM Fellow (1979)

See also
 Dennard scaling

References

External links 
 .
 .

1932 births
Living people
20th-century American inventors
American electrical engineers
Carnegie Mellon University College of Engineering alumni
People from Terrell, Texas
National Medal of Technology recipients
IEEE Edison Medal recipients
Draper Prize winners
IBM employees
IBM Fellows
Members of the United States National Academy of Engineering
MOSFETs
IEEE Medal of Honor recipients
Members of the American Philosophical Society
Kyoto laureates in Advanced Technology